Vine Hill may refer to:

in the United States
(by state)
 Vine Hill, California
 Vine Hill (Centerville, North Carolina), listed on the NRHP in North Carolina
 Vine Hill (Cross Bridge, Tennessee), listed on the NRHP in Tennessee